Air Caraïbes is a French airline based in the French West Indies, with its headquarters in Les Abymes in Guadeloupe. The airline's main base of operations is at Pointe-à-Pitre International Airport in Guadeloupe, with a focus city at Martinique Aimé Césaire International Airport, near Fort-de-France in Martinique. It operates scheduled and charter services in the West Indies, as well as transatlantic flights based at Paris Orly Airport in Metropolitan France.

History
The airline was originally established as Société Caribéenne de Transports Aériens, and started operations in September 1994. The current Air Caraïbes was founded in July 2000 through the merger of various local airlines Air Guadeloupe, Air Martinique, Air Saint Barthélémy, and Air Saint Martin, and was created in response to the air transport needs of the French Caribbean territories. In 2002, the company flew 445,000 passengers and had €68 million in revenues.

In July 2003, the airline received its first ATR 72-500. On 12 December 2003, the airline began services to Orly Airport from Guadeloupe and Martinique using an Airbus A330-200. The transatlantic services were operated under a franchise agreement by Air Caraïbes Atlantique, a jointly run subsidiary airline of Groupe Dubreuil, which was registered in Martinique with its own air operator's certificate, using an ICAO airline designator of "CAJ" and callsign of "CAR LINE". Its operations were further integrated with and operated under the airline codes of Air Caraïbes at a later date. In June 2006, Air Caraïbes expanded its Airbus A330 fleet in receiving its first Airbus A330-300, and also planned to receive another A330-300 to replace one of its A330s.

On 13 December 2013, Air Caraïbes announced it had ordered the Airbus A350, with a fleet of three A350-900s and three A350-1000s, the first of which were expected to be delivered in 2016 and 2020 respectively. On 14 December 2016, the airline received its first ATR 72-600. The airline received its first A350-900 on 28 February 2017, and its first A350-1000 on 19 December 2019. However prior to the delivery of some of the airline's A350s, parent company Groupe Dubreuil allocated some to sister airline French Bee, before ordering additional A350s for both airlines by June 2019.

Corporate affairs
Air Caraïbes uses Travel Technology Interactive's airline management system, Aeropack.

Destinations

Air Caraïbes operates both a regional network in the West Indies, and a transatlantic long-haul network based at Paris Orly Airport in France.

Codeshare agreements
Air Caraïbes has codeshare agreements with the following airlines:

Air Antilles
Bahamasair
French Bee
St Barth Commuter
Winair

The airline also codeshares with the SNCF, the French national railway operator.

Previously, Air Caraïbes had codeshare agreements with Aigle Azur until the airline ceased operations in September 2019, and with Corsair International until 26 October 2019.

Fleet

Current fleet

, the Air Caraïbes fleet (including Air Caraibes Atlantique) consists of the following aircraft:

Former fleet

Air Caraïbes and its franchised partners have operated the following aircraft types. It does not include aircraft types that were retired by its predecessor airlines prior to being merged to form Air Caraïbes.

Accidents and incidents
On 24 March 2001, Air Caraïbes Flight 1501 crashed into a house while on approach to Gustaf III Airport in Saint Barthélemy with 17 passengers and 2 crew members. All occupants were killed. One person on the ground was killed in the subsequent fire. The investigation concluded that the crash was caused by the pilot's error in managing the thrust lever. The report blamed the crew for accidentally entering the thrust into BETA range.

See also
List of airlines of France

References

External links

Official website
Official website 

Air Caraïbes
Airlines of France
Airlines of Guadeloupe
Airlines established in 2000
French brands
French companies established in 2000